The 669th Radar Squadron is an inactive United States Air Force unit. It was last assigned to the 27th Air Division, Aerospace Defense Command, stationed at Lompoc Air Force Station, California. It was discontinued on 18 June 1968.

The unit was a General Surveillance Radar squadron providing for the air defense of the United States.

Lineage
 Established as 669th Aircraft Control and Warning Squadron
 Activated on 5 May 1950
 Redesignated 669th Radar Squadron (SAGE) on 1 April 1963
 Discontinued and inactivated on 18 June 1968

Assignments
 542d Aircraft Control and Warning Group, 5 May 1950
 544th Aircraft Control and Warning Group, 27 November 1950 (attached to 27th Air Division)
 27th Air Division, 6 February 1952
 Los Angeles Air Defense Sector, 1 October 1959
 27th Air Division, 1 April 1966 – 18 June 1968

Stations
 Fort MacArthur, California, 5 May 1950
 Santa Rosa Island AFS, California, 11 February 1952
 Lompoc AFS, California, 1 April 1963 - 18 June 1968

References

  Cornett, Lloyd H. and Johnson, Mildred W., A Handbook of Aerospace Defense Organization  1946 - 1980,  Office of History, Aerospace Defense Center, Peterson AFB, CO (1980).
 Winkler, David F. & Webster, Julie L., Searching the Skies, The Legacy of the United States Cold War Defense Radar Program,  US Army Construction Engineering Research Laboratories, Champaign, IL (1997).

External links

Radar squadrons of the United States Air Force
Aerospace Defense Command units
Military units and formations established in 1949